Dancer from the Dance is a 1978 gay novel by Andrew Holleran (pen name of Eric Garber) about gay men in New York City and Fire Island.

Plot summary
The novel revolves around two main characters: Anthony Malone, a young man from the Midwest who leaves behind his straight life as a lawyer to immerse himself in the gay life of 1970s New York, and Andrew Sutherland, variously described as a speed addict, a socialite, and a drag queen. Their social life includes long nights of drinking, dancing, and drug use in New York's gay bars.  Though they enjoy many physical pleasures, their lives lack any spiritual depth.  The "dance" of the novel's title becomes a metaphor for their lives. Malone is described as preternaturally beautiful; much of the plot concerns Sutherland's efforts to leverage Malone's beauty by "marrying" him to a young millionaire.

The book switches perspective often. Sometimes characters are tracked closely using more traditional omniscient narrative techniques. On other occasions (especially later in the book), the lives of Malone and Sutherland are seen from the perspective of bystanders in the New York gay scene — the book itself is literally written by the other dancers at the dance.

Major themes 
The novel is known for its vivid imagery, lush language, and captivating depiction of gay men searching for love and acceptance in a harsh, dreamlike urban landscape. The novel was one of the first among gay fiction to portray the party atmosphere of Fire Island, a summer community on Long Island where many urban homosexuals celebrated drugs, parties, tea dances, and sexual exploration.

The title of the novel is from the last line of William Butler Yeats's poem "Among School Children", which ends, "O chestnut-tree, great-rooted blossomer,/ Are you the leaf, the blossom or the bole?/ O body swayed to music, O brightening glance,/ How can we know the dancer from the dance?"

Influence 
Published in the same year as Edmund White's Nocturnes for the King of Naples and Larry Kramer's Faggots, Dancer from the Dance is regarded as a major contribution to post-Stonewall gay male literature and it enjoyed a cult status in the gay community for a certain period of time.

References

External links 
 Post-Stonewall gay literature on glbtq.com
 Andrew Holleran on glbtq.com

1978 American novels
Novels by Andrew Holleran
Novels with gay themes
Novels set in New York City
William Morrow and Company books
1970s LGBT novels